Lap of Luxury is the tenth studio album by American band Cheap Trick. Released on April 12, 1988, it is the band's second-most commercially successful studio album (trailing only 1979's Dream Police), reaching number 16 on the Billboard 200 and being certified platinum in sales. The album contains the band's only US number-one hit, "The Flame", as well as the additional hit singles "Don't Be Cruel" (an Elvis Presley cover) and "Ghost Town".

Overview
Lap of Luxury was considered a comeback album for Cheap Trick. Before its recording, original bassist Tom Petersson rejoined the group. Owing to the band's last few albums failing to live up to commercial expectations, Epic insisted that Cheap Trick work with outside songwriters. Don Grierson, the senior VP of A&R for Epic, told Billboard in 1988: "What we attempted to do was make a statement for a band that had lost its mass-market appeal. We needed to make a record that sounded contemporary. We addressed all the reasons why [Cheap Trick] may be in trouble [commercially] and agreed that certain changes were necessary. [We found] outside writers the band was comfortable with who would make music that still sounded like Cheap Trick."

The mainstream ballad "The Flame" became a No. 1 hit single, and the album went platinum. Speaking to Billboard in 1990, Cheap Trick guitarist Rick Nielsen stated: "Lap of Luxury was a tough record to make. We could lie to you and tell you it was all wonderful and great. It wasn't. It was tough working with other writers. But it was a lesson for us."

Reception

Upon release, Billboard commented: "After a long hitless streak, Cheap Trick brings it all back home. This is the quartet's punchiest effort since its mid-'70s heyday." Cash Box noted: "Cheap Trick could score big at both radio and retail with what is easily their best (and most accessible) album in years." Pan-European magazine Music & Media considered Lap of Luxury to be an "excellent LP", adding: "A very mature album, made with renewed enthusiasm and energy. Ringing melodies and a few wonderfully restrained moments."

Ira Robbins of Rolling Stone stated: "The entire album lurches unpredictably; fortunately, Zander's superhuman vocals pull it out of the fire, transcending the inferior material and occasionally misguided arrangements. While not [a] stunning return to top form, Lap of Luxury proves that Cheap Trick can still rock with flair and power. The album's songwriting credits and halfhearted echoes of Journey, Survivor and the Eagles, however, signify a tragic loss of self-confidence."

In a retrospective review, Steve Huey of AllMusic noted: "Cheap Trick's comeback album is by no means a return to the creativity and vitality of their glory days. But even though Lap of Luxury is largely formulaic, the band's strongest collection of material in some time fills that late-'80s pop-metal formula quite well. Combining grandly romantic power ballads with catchy hard rockers, Lap of Luxury consistently delivers strong hooks and well-crafted songs." Dave Swanson of Rolling Stone commented: "The album suffers from the same identity crisis the band had been experiencing throughout the decade, and the label's demand for outside assistance in songwriting was both a blessing and a curse." Swanson noted the strongest material on the album was those written by Cheap Trick and added: "The dated '80s production is hard to tolerate at times".

Track listing

B-sides and outtakes
 "Through the Night" (R. Zander, T, Petersson, R. Nielsen,) – 4:19 (available on the Sex, America, Cheap Trick box set)
 "You Want It" (R. Zander, R. Nielsen) – 3:41 (available on the Sex, America, Cheap Trick box set, and the soundtrack to Say Anything...)
 "Magical Mystery Tour" (J. Lennon, P. McCartney) – 4:10 (available on The Greatest Hits)
 "Money (That's What I Want)" (J. Bradford, B. Gordy, Jr.) – 3:15 (available on the out-of-print Caddyshack II soundtrack)
 "If Only My Girl Was a Little More Like You" (unreleased)
 "A Long Way from Memphis" (unreleased)
 "Ready for the Sun" (unreleased)
 "Right Between the Eyes" (unreleased)
 "A Taste of Love" (unreleased)
 "We'll Still Be Hangin' On" (Nielsen, Jonathan Cain; unreleased - covered by Show-Ya on Glamour)
 "Women Never Forget" (unreleased)

Personnel
Cheap Trick
 Robin Zander – lead vocals and backing vocals, rhythm guitars and synthesizers
 Rick Nielsen – lead guitars and backing vocals
 Tom Petersson – 12 string bass and backing vocals
 Bun E. Carlos – drums and percussions

Technical
 Richie Zito – producer
 Phil Kaffel – engineer
 Jim Champagne, Bernard Frings, Mike Tacci, Bob Vogt, Toby Wright – assistant engineers
 Howie Weinberg – mastering
 Caroline Greyshock – photography

Charts

Weekly charts

Year-end charts

2017 reissue

Singles

Certifications

References

Cheap Trick albums
1988 albums
Epic Records albums
Albums produced by Richie Zito
Albums recorded at A&M Studios